"Let Old Mother Nature Have Her Way" is a 1951 song by Loys Sutherland and Louie Clark, first recorded by Carl Smith. "Let Old Mother Nature Have Her Way" was Smith's first number one on the Billboard country and western best seller chart, spending eight weeks at the top spot and total of 33 weeks on the chart.

While originally released as a 78 record, Smith later released a version of the song on his 1957 album, Sentimental Songs.

The song was also covered by Faron Young on his 1962 album, Four Walls.

See also
 Billboard Top Country & Western Records of 1952

References
 

 

1951 songs
Carl Smith (musician) songs